The 384th Air Expeditionary Wing is an inactive unit of the United States Air Force. Its last assignment was with the United States Central Command Air Forces, being stationed at Shaikh Isa Air Base, Bahrain. It was inactivated in 2004. The wing's mission is largely undisclosed. However, it is known that one of its missions was aerial refueling of combat aircraft.

History
 For additional history and lineage, see 384th Air Expeditionary Group

Cold War

The 384th Bombardment Wing of the United States Air Force Strategic Air Command was established at Little Rock Air Force Base, Arkansas 1 August 1955. With its establishment, the 384th Bomb Group was activated as the operational group of the wing, bestowing its World War II honors, heritage and colors to the new Wing.  Operational squadrons of the wing were the 544th, 545th, and 546th Bomb Squadrons.  It was equipped with the Boeing B-47E Stratojet.

The 384 BW accomplished a truly remarkable feat by being certified combat ready just nine months after receiving its first aircraft. Stringent SAC requirements called for a specified percentage of the crews to be certified in order for the wing to be considered combat ready. Since aircrew members were fresh out of student status, beginning to arrive about the same times the aircraft did, preparing the group to become fully combat ready was a tremendous task. The culture of the organization would accept nothing less than full effort, and when the newly formed wing was mission capable by September 1956, it became the first such SAC wing to do so in such a short time.

The 384 BW handled bomber alert duties, spending countless days and nights on alert status with their aircraft armed, fueled, and ready to go at a moment's notice. The 384th aircrews also commonly participated in REFLEX operations, spending short but continually recurring periods of time at forward locations around the world.

The era of the Stratojet ended on 1 September 1964 when the 384 BW inactivated with the phaseout of the B-47 from the USAF inventory.

Aerial Refueling

The 384th was reactivated on 1 December 1972 as the 384th Air Refueling Wing, Heavy at McConnell Air Force Base, Kansas with Boeing KC-135A Stratotankers and took command of the 91st Air Refueling Squadron (ARS). It was assigned to the 12th Strategic Missile Division, Fifteenth Air Force, Strategic Air Command.

From McConnell, the wing deployed aircraft and crews on a worldwide basis, engaging in actual and simulated tactical and strategic operations, including air refueling support for the
evacuation of South Vietnamese and Americans from South Vietnam in 1975. The wing maintained proficiency in air refueling in support of SAC units and other units as directed.

The wing was reassigned to Second Air Force, 19th Air Division on 1 July 1973. On 30 September 1973, a second KC-135A refueling squadron, the 384th ARS was activated on the base, making McConnell an air refueling hub for SAC. The wing was again reassigned to Eighth Air Force, 19th Air Division on 1 January 1975.

In early 1983, the 384 ARW's leadership learned that it would be the first wing to receive the new Boeing KC-135R model tanker.  The 91st and 384th ARW were both upgraded to the new model in 1984. The "R" model had upgraded engines which produce much greater fuel efficiency than the older models, as well as having a higher on-board fuel storage capacity. The initial aircraft marking for both squadrons was a light blue/navy blue diamond checkerboard fin flash.

B-1B Era

On 2 October 1981, President Ronald Reagan announced a Strategic Modernization Program (SMP), a key feature of which would be the procurement of 100 North American–Rockwell B-1B bombers.  The first production models entered the USAF inventory in March 1985. It was announced by the Air Force that McConnell would be equipped with the B-1B in 1987. The 384th was redesignated as the 384th Bombardment Wing, Heavy on 1 July 1987, and the 28th Bombardment Squadron was activated that date to fly the 25 bombers assigned to the wing. Aircrews for the initial cadre that formed the 28th BMS arrived for training at Dyess AFB, TX in October 1987, with the first crews arriving for duty at McConnell AFB, KS in March – June 1988. With the arrival of the B-1s, the 91st ARS was inactivated, leaving the wing with one KC-135 tanker squadron. The 91st was later reactivated in July 1988 with the new 301st ARW at Malmstrom AFB, Montana with KC-135R aircraft.

Throughout 1988–1989, the Wing continued to train to the full capabilities of the B-1B Bomber. The big push through 1989 was certifying all bomber crews in night terrain-following (TF) flying and for the Wing to become Mission Ready to perform its SIOP mission. These efforts paid-off with the 384 Bomb Wing winning the "BEST ORI IN SAC" award for 1989. In addition, that year, the Wing achieved the "BEST B-1B CREW" while performing in the 15th Air Force Bombing Competition. In 1990, the Bomb Wing again won top honors in SAC. That year it recorded the highest score during an ORI by any Bomb Wing in the history of SAC and its B-1B crews were rated OUTSTANDING in war fighting capability.

In August 1990, Iraq invaded neighboring Kuwait. McConnell tanker personnel and aircraft were deployed throughout the Middle East, performing refueling missions of Coalition aircraft in support of Operation Desert Shield/Desert Storm to help eject the invaders from the small kingdom of Kuwait. The wing's B-1B aircraft, however, were not used in Desert Storm, the official reason being that the B-1Bs were all needed to stand nuclear alert – which they did. However, at that time the B-1B had been encountering a rash of turbofan blade failures that caused the aircraft to be grounded through most of Desert Storm. At the same time, required weapons testing for the safe release of conventional bomb delivery had encountered test problems, and the aircraft was not certified to drop conventional weapons until after the war ended.

From 1991 
With the end of the Cold War, the Air Force went through many changes.   One of these changes was the Objective Wing concept, with created "Operations Groups" (OG) to place all operational aircraft squadrons under one organization. The 384th engaged this change on 1 September 1991 and was re-designated as the 384th Wing (384 WG), with the 28th Bomb Squadron (B-1B) and the 384th Air Refueling Squadron (KC-135R) as its operational units.

On 1 June 1992, Strategic Air Command (SAC) was inactivated as part of a massive realignment of the Air Force command structure.   The 384th was assigned to the newly established Air Combat Command (ACC), a new command which replaced SAC, TAC and elements of Military Airlift Command (MAC).  The wing was again redesignated as the 384th Bomb Wing, and the 28 BS aircraft were assigned the tail code "OZ".  The 384 ARS was relieved from assignment to McConnell, and was reassigned to the 19th Operations Group of the 19th Air Refueling Wing at Robins AFB, Georgia.

As a result of a Base Realignment and Closure (BRAC) Commission related realignment, March AFB, California was taken off active duty status and reassigned to the Air Force Reserve Command as an air reserve base. As part of a program to keep historically significant wings active, its 22d Air Refueling Wing was reassigned to McConnell without personnel or equipment on 1 January 1994.  As a result, on 1 January, the 384th was re-designated as the 384th Bomb Group as a unit under the 22 ARW.

The USAF planned to return McConnell AFB to being an air refueling hub, and as a result the B-1 equipped 28th Bomb Squadron was reassigned without equipment or personnel to the 7 OG at Dyess AFB, Texas on 1 October 1994 and the 384 BG was inactivated on 30 September 1994.

Global War on Terror
The 384th AEW was in existence at an unidentified Middle Eastern location in June 2002.

From February–May 2003, the 384 AEW was in existence at Sheik Isa Air Base, Bahrain.

On 4 June, the 319th Air Expeditionary Group operating from Shaik Isa Airbase, Bahrain, was redesignated as the 384th Air Expeditionary Group, which was redesignated as the 384th Air Expeditionary Wing on 3 September.

The Wing was inactivated in 2004.

Other reports have suggested that the 319th AEG was operating from 'Base X' in Oman, which other sources labelled Masirah Air Base.

Lineage, assignments, etc 
 Established as 384th Bombardment Wing, Medium, on 23 March 1953
 Activated on 1 August 1955
 Discontinued, and inactivated, on 1 September 1964
 Redesignated 384th Air Refueling Wing, Heavy, on 15 November 1972
 Activated on 1 December 1972
 Redesignated 384th Bombardment Wing, Heavy on 1 July 1987
 Redesignated 384th Wing, 1 September 1991
 Redesignated 384th Bomb Wing, 1 June 1992
 Inactivated with personnel and equipment being absorbed by 384th Bomb Group, 1 January 1994
 Redesignated 384th Air Expeditionary Wing on 3 September 2003.
 Activated by redesignation of 384th Air Expeditionary Group on 3 September 2003
 Inactivated in 2004 (Date TBD)

Assignments
 825th Air (later, 825th Strategic Aerospace) Division, 1 August 1955 – 1 September 1964
 Attached to 7th Air Division, 3 January-5 April 1957
 12th Strategic Missile (later, 12th Air) Division, 1 December 1972
 19th Air Division, 1 July 1973
 Strategic Air Command, 1 July 1987
 Eighth Air Force, 1 June 1992 – 1 January 1994
 United States Central Command Air Forces, 3 September 2003 – 2004

Components
 28th Bombardment Squadron, (1 July 1987 – 1 October 1994)
70th Bombardment Squadron (1 August 1961 – 1 September 1964)
 91st Air Refueling Squadron (1 December 1972 – 1987)
 384th Air Refueling Squadron (30 September 1973 – 1994)
 544th Bombardment Squadron (1 August 1955 – 1 September 1964)
 545th Bombardment Squadron (1 August 1955 – 1 September 1964)
 546th Bombardment Squadron (1 August 1955 – 1 September 1964)
 547th Bombardment Squadron (1 September 1958 – 1 January 1962)
 27th Munitions Maintenance Squadron (1 August 1955 – 1 September 1964)

Stations
Little Rock AFB, Arkansas, 1 August 1955 – 1 September 1964
McConnell AFB, Kansas, 1 December 1972 – 1 October 1994
Shaikh Isa Air Base, Bahrain (2003–2004)

Aircraft
KC-135 (2003–2004)
B-1B (1988–1994)
KC-135 (1964; 1972–1994)
KC-97 (1961–1963)
B-47 (1956–1964)

See also
 List of B-47 units of the United States Air Force

References

 Mueller, Robert. Active Air Force Bases Within the United States of America on 17 September 1982. USAF Reference Series, Maxwell AFB, Alabama: Office of Air Force History, 1989. .
 Ravenstein, Charles A. Air Force Combat Wings Lineage and Honors Histories, 1947–1977. Maxwell Air Force Base, Alabama: Office of Air Force History, 1984. .
 Rogers, Brian. United States Air Force Unit Designations Since 1978. Hinkley, UK: Midland Publications, 2005. .

External links
 http://www.strategic-air-command.com/bases/McConnell_AFB.htm

Military units and formations established in 1953
0384